Lars Johan Vatten (born 20 August 1952) is a Norwegian epidemiologist. He has done research on cancer, perinatal and cardiovascular epidemiology.

Biography
Vatten was born in Trondheim, Norway, studied Medicine at the University of Tromsø (he was made MD in 1980) and received a Master of Public Health in 1988 from the University of North Carolina. Two years later the University of Trondheim awarded him a PhD.

He initially worked for his internship at the Molde County Hospital from 1980 to 1981 and Sunndal from 1981 to 1982. After serving at the Royal Norwegian Navy he became a family doctor at the University of Trondheim from 1983 to 1986. After a year of training in occupational medicine he joined the Norwegian Cancer Society as a research fellow from 1987-90. In 1990 he changed to the Norwegian Medical Research Council to work there as a scientist in Epidemiology.

In 1996, he became chair of the Epidemiology Department at the Norwegian University of Science and Technology Medical School, a post he still holds. From 1997–2002 he was adjunct lecturer in cancer epidemiology at the Harvard School of Public Health in Boston, US. He also was Professor in Epidemiology at the University of Bergen, Norway, from 2002–2003 and a senior research fellow at the International Agency for Research on Cancer, Lyon, from 2007 to 2008. Since 2008 Lars Vatten holds an honorary professorship at Bristol University and is a visiting scientist of the Harvard School of Public Health (now Harvard T.H. Chan School of Public Health) since 2009. Since 2010 Lars Vatten has become a senior research fellow of the International Prevention Research Institute, Lyon, France.

Scientific merits
Vatten's specific field of research is epidemiological research. He has contributed to the fields of cancer, perinatal and cardiovascular epidemiology.

He has published more than 200 articles in scientific journals and is co-author of some books.

Lars Vatten is a Member of The Royal Norwegian Society of Sciences and Letters.

He received in 2010 the King Olav V's Prize for Cancer Research from the Norwegian Cancer Society.

References

External links
 Lars Vatten at Harvard Catalyst

Cancer researchers
Norwegian public health doctors
Harvard Medical School faculty
Harvard School of Public Health faculty
People from Trondheim
University of Tromsø alumni
1952 births
Living people
Royal Norwegian Society of Sciences and Letters